Dias Alface is a Mozambican long-distance runner. He competed in the men's 10,000 metres at the 1980 Summer Olympics.

References

External links
 

Year of birth missing (living people)
Living people
Athletes (track and field) at the 1980 Summer Olympics
Mozambican male long-distance runners
Olympic athletes of Mozambique
Place of birth missing (living people)